Terri Stivers is a fictional character in Homicide: Life on the Street. She was played by actress Toni Lewis.

Stivers first appears in Season 5 as a detective in the Baltimore Police Department's narcotics unit, frequently collaborating with the homicide detectives in an effort to bring down drug kingpin Luther Mahoney. After Mike Kellerman kills Mahoney under questionable circumstances, the two of them and fellow detective Meldrick Lewis report the incident as a justified self-defense shooting. In Season 6, she serves brief stints in the burglary and sex crime units before transferring to homicide.

The questionable shooting touches off a war between the Mahoney organization and the police department, resulting in multiple casualties on both sides. After Stivers admits that the reports were not accurate, the truth about the shooting comes out and Kellerman resigns in order to save Stivers' and Lewis' jobs. Stivers remains in the homicide unit, but when she encounters Kellerman (now a private investigator) in Season 7, she criticizes him for the effect his actions have had on the department. She also expresses her dislike of new detective Rene Sheppard's inability to control the streets and forms a friendship with Laura Ballard, a more competent member of the homicide unit.

Her maternal grandmother was Trinidadian. She immigrated to the United States when she was a girl, went to college and became a teacher.

References

Homicide: Life on the Street characters
Fictional Baltimore Police Department detectives
Fictional African-American people
Television characters introduced in 1996